Siena Christen is a former para-athlete from Germany who competed mainly in F12 category shot put and discus throw events.

She competed in the shot put and discus events at the Paralympic Games in 2000, 2004, 2008, and 2012. In 2000, Christen won a bronze medal in the women's shot put F12 event.

At the 2006 IPC Athletics World Championships, she won a silver medal in the discus throw F12 event and a bronze medal in the shot put F12 event.

References

External links
 

Year of birth missing (living people)
Living people
German female discus throwers
German female shot putters
Visually impaired discus throwers
Visually impaired shot putters
Paralympic discus throwers
Paralympic shot putters
Paralympic athletes of Germany
Paralympic bronze medalists for Germany
Paralympic medalists in athletics (track and field)
Athletes (track and field) at the 2000 Summer Paralympics
Athletes (track and field) at the 2004 Summer Paralympics
Athletes (track and field) at the 2008 Summer Paralympics
Athletes (track and field) at the 2012 Summer Paralympics
Medalists at the 2000 Summer Paralympics